Ruslan Marushka (born 23 August 1998) is a Ukrainian professional footballer who plays as a defender for Bałtyk Koszalin.

Career
Marushka is a product of the Sportive youth school of FC Lviv.

He made his debut for FC Volyn Lutsk played as a second-time substituted player in the game against FC Dnipro on 22 October 2016 in the Ukrainian Premier League.

References

External links 

 

1998 births
Living people
Sportspeople from Lviv
Ukrainian footballers
Association football defenders
Ukraine youth international footballers
Ukrainian Premier League players
III liga players
FC Volyn Lutsk players
FC Rukh Lviv players
FC Karpaty Halych players
Ukrainian expatriate footballers
Expatriate footballers in Poland
Ukrainian expatriate sportspeople in Poland